Amadeus Suropati  (born 31 December 1985) is an Indonesian-Australian footballer who previously played for Bali United in the Indonesia Super League. He plays as a striker

Amadeus began his career attending the Gianni Oddone Football Academy in Torino, Italy where he won trophy for Best Player of 2001 Academy U-17 International Summer Stage Tournament.

He continued his career in Indonesia, playing in the national youth league for two professional clubs Persekaba Badung U-16 and PSIM Jogjakarta U-18. In 2004, he then traveled to Australia to play in the ACT U-19 Premier League representing Canberra City FC. There he won the Golden Boot 2004 for Top Scorer U-19.

He returned to Indonesia in 2005 and played for several local clubs before signing on to his first professional senior contract in 2008 with the Indonesian super league club Deltras Sidoarjo for a year before returning to Australia.

In 2010, he played for Brunswick City in Melbourne and then he join Forrestfield United in Perth where he won the state league 1 champion title. After 2 years of play in Australia, he received an offer from Arema Indonesia and played half season in the breakaway Indonesian Premier League.

He joined Pusamania Borneo FC in 2014 which became champion and was promoted into the Super League. He then decide to join his home town club Bali United where he played in the 2015 Indonesian Super League before the league stop due of the conflicts between the federation and the government that caused force majeure.

He left Indonesia after FIFA banned Indonesian football in 2015.

Honours 
 Liga Indonesia Premier Division
 Champions: 2014

References

External links 
 

1985 births
Living people
Indonesian footballers
Indonesian expatriate footballers
PSIM Yogyakarta players
Deltras F.C. players
Arema F.C. players
Bali United F.C. players
Borneo F.C. players
Liga 1 (Indonesia) players
Sportspeople from Bali
Indonesian people of Australian descent
Indo people
Australian people of Indonesian descent
Association football forwards